Olevano may refer to several places:

Olevano di Lomellina,  Italian municipality of the province of Pavia
Olevano Romano, Italian municipality of the province of Roma
Olevano sul Tusciano, Italian municipality of the province of Salerno